Fabrício Santos Simões (born 26 December 1984) is a Brazilian professional footballer who plays as a forward for Portuguese club B-SAD.

He spent most of his career in Portugal, playing in the Primeira Liga for União Leiria, and in the second tier for six clubs, achieveing totals of 172 games and 46 goals in the latter competition. He also played in Angola and Cyprus.

Career

Early years
After several spells with lower league Brazilian clubs, Fabrício moved to Portugal in 2006 with Madeiran club C.S.D. Câmara de Lobos where he remained for one season. The following few seasons saw him move frequently through several amateur clubs in the country, including A.D. Machico, Sport Benfica e Castelo Branco and CD Operário.

In January 2011, after a successful first half of the season with Operário where he scored 16 goals in 19 games, Fabrício moved to Primeira Liga side U.D. Leiria on a contract lasting until 2014. He debuted for his new club on the 6 February in an away league fixture against S.C. Olhanense. The following week he scored in a 1–0 victory over C.D. Nacional.

In the summer of 2011, after failing to establish himself at Leiria, Fabrício joined G.D. Estoril Praia on a season-long loan. His season with Estoril saw him make 32 appearances in which he contributed six goals to help his side gain promotion to the top flight of Portuguese football. Despite his contribution towards Estoril's promotion, the Canarinhos decided not to purchase the player on a permanent basis and returned him to União de Leiria, who terminated his contract and granted his release in May 2012. 

Weeks after his release from Leiria, Fabrício signed for Segunda Liga side S.C. Covilhã on a free transfer. He made his official debut for his new side on 28 July in a Taça da Liga fixture against F.C. Arouca where he scored a hat-trick in a 4–2 win. His stay with the Leões da Serra ended with 16 goals in 46 appearances.

Angola and Cyprus
On the 29 June, he left  for Angolan side Recreativo da Caála.

Following more experience in the African country with S.L. Benfica (Luanda), Atlético Petróleos de Luanda and C.R.D. Libolo, Fabrício came back to Europe in August 2017 when he joined Alki Oroklini of the Cypriot First Division. He scored 20 times in his first season, including a hat-trick on 30 January in a 4–3 home loss to Ermis Aradippou FC; this tally put him third in the league's goalscorers, behind Matt Derbyshire and Florian Taulemesse.

Return to Portugal
In May 2018, Fabrício came back to Portugal's second tier, joining F.C. Famalicão on a one-year deal with the option of a second. He scored 16 times in his one season in Vila Nova de Famalicão, putting him joint with F.C. Penafiel's Jorge Pires as the division's top scorer while his team returned to the top flight for the first time in a quarter of a century. 

In the summer of 2019, Fabrício stayed in the second tier, joining S.C. Farense on the same contract as before, and after a second successive promotion he made his way to C.D. Feirense on 5 July 2020. Remaining in the same league, he signed for C.F. Estrela da Amadora on 23 June 2021.

References

External links
 
 

1984 births
Living people
Sportspeople from Espírito Santo
Brazilian footballers
Association football forwards
Segunda Divisão players
Primeira Liga players
Liga Portugal 2 players
Cypriot First Division players
Estrela do Norte Futebol Clube players
Atlético Petróleos de Luanda players
G.D. Estoril Praia players
S.C. Covilhã players
S.L. Benfica (Luanda) players
Sport Benfica e Castelo Branco players
Clube Atlético Penapolense players
C.R. Caála players
C.R.D. Libolo players
Alki Oroklini players
F.C. Famalicão players
S.C. Farense players
C.D. Feirense players
C.F. Estrela da Amadora players
Belenenses SAD players
Brazilian expatriate footballers
Expatriate footballers in Portugal
Brazilian expatriate sportspeople in Portugal
Expatriate footballers in Angola
Brazilian expatriate sportspeople in Angola
Expatriate footballers in Cyprus
Brazilian expatriate sportspeople in Cyprus